Next Up, formerly known as The Bus Project, is a non-profit organization that amplifies the voice and leadership of diverse young people to achieve a more just and equitable Oregon. For over sixteen years, Next Up has amplified the voice and leadership of diverse youth activists to achieve a more just and equitable state.

History and influence 
The Bus Project was founded in 2001. In the 2004 election, Bus volunteers canvassed numerous voters around the state, which may have contributed to the Oregon State Senate switching from Republican to Democratic control. In the 2006 Oregon elections, the Oregon House of Representatives flipped to Democratic control following extensive canvassing by the Bus Project.

Voter engagement

Building Votes
Building Votes is the non-profit, non-partisan voter registration arm of the Bus Project. It aims to assist citizens under 30 years old to register and vote and to educate themselves about issues and politics. In the 2006 election cycle, Building Votes registered 20,000 new voters in Oregon, increasing the size of the overall under-30 electorate in Oregon by 6%.

Trick-Or-Vote

Trick or Vote, the Halloween canvass, witnessed a turnout of over 800 people to volunteer for half a day in 2004, and over 500 people for the mid-term election in 2006.  A mass costume canvass to get out the vote is followed by an evening of entertainment and music, the Trick-or-Vote canvass has been replicated by other organizations from Montana to Florida.

PolitiCorps
During the summer of 2005, the Bus Project Fellowship Program, PolitiCorps was launched, providing unique opportunities for 13 college students and recent graduates, and featuring a curriculum of over 50 speakers from across the political spectrum.  The following summer, the program expanded to 22 fellows and in 2007 it was expanded to its current size of 24 fellows.

PolitiCorps is a political immersion program that provides future leaders with skills training, policy courses, and intensive fieldwork. These courses include campaign management training, public speaking and debate, political messaging and media courses, and more. Fellows spend a significant amount of their time conducting fieldwork with partner programs, directly impacting state and local races by working to increase urban youth voter registration and participating and organizing Bus trips to swing districts to canvass for progressive candidates. The program seeks to educate fellows on the intricacies of state politics, using Oregon as a model. In addition, it is designed to take these lessons and connect them to the national arena.

"Vote, F*cker"
The "Vote, F*cker" T-shirts have received national media attention in numerous newspapers and magazines.
The shirts were first created in response to an Urban Outfitter shirt with the slogan "Voting is for Old People".

Debates
The Candidates Gone Wild local debates in Portland, Oregon drew over 2000 people, the largest local debates in the state.  Co-hosted with the Willamette Week newspaper, the event pushes local and statewide candidates outside the box for a lively and irreverent night of film, music, animation, performance, and debate.
The BrewHaHa is the regular public forum on local issues co-hosted with the Portland Mercury in Portland and with Eugene Weekly in Lane County.

BusPAC
The BusPAC has canvassed swing legislative districts on behalf of select progressive candidates running for state legislative races.  Nine out of the ten State Senate candidates they have supported have won.  One won by forty votes; each volunteer knocked on more doors than that in a single day.

More information

Bus Project Slogans
Not left, not right, but forward.
Volunteer.
Engage. Educate. Elect.
Exact Change
Vote, F*cker!
Trick or Vote!
Making politics fun again
Get on the Bus!
We're not just asking people to vote, we're asking them to change the world
Smart and Funny is better than stupid and boring. But if you have to pick, stupid is better than boring

Legal status
The Bus comprises three organizations, each of which operates under a different section of U.S. and state tax and election laws:

 The Bus Project, a 501(c)(4) organization, primarily focuses on education and advocacy on important statewide issues. Under U.S. tax laws, a 501(c)(4) organization can engage in lobbying for legislative change but is not allowed to intervene in political campaigns in support of or opposition to any candidate for public office.
 BusPAC, an Oregon state PAC, primarily helps members elect candidates who reflect the organization's progressive values. Unlike 501(c)(4) organizations, PACs are allowed to directly support individual candidates.
 The Oregon Progress Forum, a 501(c)(3) organization, registers young voters.

References

 
 
Building an Army on Wheels on AlterNet
On a Roll in Eugene Weekly
Oregon Bus Project Targets Electing Democrats to the State Legislature in the Northwest Labor Press
Oregon Bus Project Rolls Into Salem on Salem-News.com
Oregon Bus Project Tries to Gear Up Young Voters in the Salem Statesman Journal
The Fight for Democracy in the Portland Tribune

External links
Official website
Building Votes
Engage Oregon Conference

Non-profit organizations based in Oregon
Organizations established in 2001
2001 establishments in Oregon
Youth organizations based in Oregon